John Henry Slappey (August 8, 1898 – June 10, 1957) was a Major League Baseball pitcher who played in  with the Philadelphia Athletics.

External links

1898 births
1957 deaths
Major League Baseball pitchers
Baseball players from Georgia (U.S. state)
Philadelphia Athletics players